Luis Alberto Orta Sánchez (born 22 August 1994) is a Cuban Greco-Roman wrestler who competes at 60 kilograms. He claimed the 2020 Summer Olympic gold medal in 2021, and had previously claimed continental championships at the 2018 Central American and Caribbean Games and the 2018 and 2019 Pan American Championships.

References

External links
 

1994 births
Living people
Cuban male sport wrestlers
Olympic wrestlers of Cuba
Wrestlers at the 2020 Summer Olympics
Medalists at the 2020 Summer Olympics
Olympic medalists in wrestling
Olympic gold medalists for Cuba
Place of birth missing (living people)
Pan American Games medalists in wrestling
Central American and Caribbean Games gold medalists for Cuba
Central American and Caribbean Games medalists in wrestling
Competitors at the 2018 Central American and Caribbean Games
Medalists at the 2019 Pan American Games
Pan American Games bronze medalists for Cuba
21st-century Cuban people